Pulcrano is a surname. Notable people with the surname include:

Dan Pulcrano (born 1959), American journalist, publisher, newspaper owner, and Web executive
Enzo Pulcrano (1943–1992), Italian actor and writer